is a passenger railway station located in the town of Tano, Aki District, Kōchi Prefecture, Japan. It is operated by the third-sector Tosa Kuroshio Railway with the station number "GN22".

Lines

Layout
The station consists of two opposed side platforms serving two elevated tracks. There is no station building but both platforms have shelters for waiting passengers. Access to the each platform is by separate flights of steps. Another shelter and a bike shed have been built near the base of the steps.

Adjacent stations

Station mascot
Each station on the Asa Line features a cartoon mascot character designed by Takashi Yanase, a local cartoonist from Kōchi Prefecture. The mascot for Tano Station is a samurai warrior named .

History

Passenger statistics
In fiscal 2011, the station was used by an average of 138 passengers daily.

Surrounding area
Tano Town Office
Tano Elementary School
Tano Town Tano Junior High School*
Kochi Prefectural Junior High Schoo

See also 
List of railway stations in Japan

References

External links

Railway stations in Kōchi Prefecture
Railway stations in Japan opened in 2002